Broxburn Athletic Football Club is a Scottish football club based in the town of Broxburn in West Lothian. They play their home games at Albyn Park.

History
Broxburn reached the Scottish Junior Cup semi-final on five occasions, the last time being in 1971 when they lost by a single goal to eventual cup winners Cambuslang Rangers.

The club won the East Region South Division in 2009–10 and then gained promotion to the East Superleague two years later. They spent six seasons in the Superleague, with a best finish of 5th in their final season.

After moving to the senior football pyramid for the 2018–19 season, Broxburn won the East of Scotland League Conference C. However they narrowly missed out on the title and promotion to the Lowland league in the round robin playoff against the winners of the other Conferences, Penicuik Athletic and Bonnyrigg Rose.

The club became a full SFA member in 2019 which allowed them to enter the 2019-20 Scottish Cup. They reached the fourth round having won five matches (including victories over higher ranked East Stirlingshire, Cowdenbeath, and Inverurie Loco Works), before going out to Premiership side St. Mirren in Paisley. Broxburn were supported by 1,600 fans who made the trip along the M8, selling out the North Stand at St Mirren Park.

Albyn Park
In 1946, Mr. G. W. Bartaby-Pearson, with the help of local businessmen, started the process of reforming Broxburn and secured Albyn Park from the Earl of Buchan. After help from supporters who made the ground improvements, the stadium opened in 1948 with a Heart of Midlothian v Rangers meeting which attracted a crowd of around 3,500.

Albyn Park was completely redeveloped in 2009–10 as part of the Broxburn United Sports Club project into a new community facility with a 3G artificial pitch (replaced 2020).

It sits on the original Albion Park used by Broxburn F.C. in 1889. Athletic took over the lease in 1894 until both clubs amalgamated in 1912 and played at the sports park (now the Broxburn Sports Centre). Athletic then moved back in 1921 until going defunct in 1924. West Lothian Council now owns the land and Broxburn has a lease until 2036.

The facility is also used by Broxburn Athletic Colts and other clubs. New changing rooms, a social club and floodlights were also constructed. The ground includes a large enclosure on the same side as the changing rooms. The remainder of the ground consists of grass bankings and covered terracing.

Senior squad
As of 25 November 2020

Club staff

Board of directors

Coaching staff 

Source

Managerial history

c Caretaker manager

Season-by-season record

Senior

† Season curtailed due to COVID-19 pandemic - Broxburn Athletic finished third, based on the 'points per game' measure.

Honours
East of Scotland League Conference C: 2018–19

Junior
East Region League: 1972–73, 1973–74
East Region South Division: 2009–10
East Region Lothian District Division Two: 2003–04, 2005–06
East Region Division B: 1978–79
East of Scotland Junior Cup:  1950–51, 1987–88
East Region League Cup: 1952–53, 1954–55, 1972–73
Coronation Cup: 1952–53
Murray Cup: 1959–60
Brown Cup: 1970–71
National Whitbread Trophy: 1973–74
Thistle Cup: 1970–71
R.L. Rae Cup: 1972-73

Record attendances 

31,085 - 1950-51 Scottish Junior Cup Semi Final vs Irvine Meadow, Hampden Park, Glasgow
11,400 - 1951-52 Scottish Junior Cup vs Kilsyth Rangers, Albyn Park, Broxburn
4,372 - 2019-20 Scottish Cup 4th Round vs St. Mirren, Simple Digital Arena, Paisley

References

External links 
 Official Club Website
 Facebook
 Twitter

 
Football clubs in Scotland
Scottish Junior Football Association clubs
Association football clubs established in 1948
Football in West Lothian
1948 establishments in Scotland
Broxburn, West Lothian
East of Scotland Football League teams